Ronald Hunt may refer to:
 Ronald Hunt (art historian) (born 1936), English art historian
 Ronald Hunt (politician) (1897–1968), Australian politician
 Ronald Hunt (wrestler)  (born 1929), Australian wrestler

See also 
 Ronald Leigh-Hunt (1920–2005), British film and television actor